Mayabic, or Mayi, is a small family of extinct Australian Aboriginal languages of Queensland. They were once classified as Paman, but now as a separate branch of Pama–Nyungan.

The languages are:
 Mayi-Kutuna, Mayi-Kulan (incl. Mayi-Thakurti, Mayi-Yapi), Ngawun (incl. Wunumara)

According to Dixon (2002), Wunumara may have been a dialect of Ngawun or of Mayi-Kulan, which may have been a single language. Bowern (2011 [2012]), however, lists all six of the above as separate languages.

External links 
 Paradisec has an open access collection of Gavan Breen's materials for Wunumara

References

 
Extinct languages of Queensland